Antonella Bragaglia (born 4 February 1973) was an Italian female volleyball player. She was part of the Italy women's national volleyball team.

She competed with the national team at the 2000 Summer Olympics in Sydney, Australia, finishing 9th.

See also
 Italy at the 2000 Summer Olympics

References

External links
 
 http://www.legavolleyfemminile.it/?page_id=194&idat=BRA-ANT-73
 http://ftp.worldofvolley.com/wov-community/players/2886/antonella-bragaglia.html
http://sport.repubblica.it/news/sport/volley-a2-donne-nocera-ingaggia-antonella-bragaglia/1624723?refresh_ce

1973 births
Living people
Italian women's volleyball players
Volleyball players at the 2000 Summer Olympics
Olympic volleyball players of Italy